Ardit Beqiri (born 13 February 1979) is an Albanian retired footballer.

Club career
He played the majority of his career as a defender or midfielder for Partizani and retired at FC Kamza.

International career
He made his debut for Albania in a January 2002 friendly match against Macedonia and earned a total of 12 caps, scoring no goals. His final international was a March 2006 friendly match against Georgia.

References

External links

1979 births
Living people
Footballers from Shkodër
Albanian footballers
Association football midfielders
Albania international footballers
FK Partizani Tirana players
KF Tirana players
KF Elbasani players
KF Vllaznia Shkodër players
Albanian football managers
FC Kamza managers